Psiloibidion leucogramma is a species of beetle in the family Cerambycidae. It was described by Martins in 1968.

References 

Beetles described in 1968
Cerambycidae